Ugoszcz  is a village in the administrative district of Gmina Brzuze, within Rypin County, Kuyavian-Pomeranian Voivodeship, in north-central Poland. It is located on the northern shore of Lake Ugoszcz in the historic Dobrzyń Land.

History
Ugoszcz was a private village of Polish nobility, including the Zieliński and Borzewski families, and its landmark is the Borzewski Palace. In 1827, the village had a population of 349.

References

Populated lakeshore places in Poland
Ugoszcz